Nethercote is a hamlet on the edge of north Oxfordshire, a semi-rural area bordering with West Northamptonshire. The hamlet sits South East of J11 of M40, lying South of the A422 and East of the M40. Predominantly agricultural land used for grazing, a single-track road runs right through the hamlet, known as Banbury Lane, which has around a dozen residential properties along the lane.  Banbury Lane is still often referred to as Blacklocks Hill and this refers to the history of the area and a time when this area saw a main route into Banbury, before the M40 and A422. In 1870-72 it had a population of 97.

History
The name Nethercote is thought to have derived from the proximity to Warkworth. The word Nethercote is derived from the Middle English words “nether(e)” meaning “lower” and “cot” meaning cottage.

Until 1889, Nethercote, along with the nearby then hamlet of Grimsbury were considered to be part of Warkworth in Northamptonshire, although they were both part of the Banbury (UK Parliament constituency) since 1832. At that time, a further hamlet of Huscote lay North of Nethercote  however today there only remains a farm in that area.  There are 35 tree preservation orders on Huscote, Banbury Farm today 

An open field system of farming prevailed in Warkworth until the 18th century. Its land tenure was linked with that of Overthorpe and Nethercote, which at that time was part of Middleton Cheney parish. Parliament passed a single Inclosure Act for both Overthorpe and Warkworth in 1764. Today only Nethercote has  ridge and furrow land form remaining from these times

Throughout the Middle Ages until the mid-eighteenth century, Nethercote along with the original hamlet of Grimsbury and to some extent Huscote, Banbury was the centre of Banbury's cheese making trade, a product that was made from local resources and much prized at the time, although there is little mention of it by the nineteenth century.

Klaus Fuchs is said to have handed over the secret formula of the atom bomb to a Russian spy on a bench in Nethercote in 1945.

Heritage
Home Farmhouse in Nethercote is a Grade II Listed Building.

There are currently seven Tree preservation orders made on trees in Nethercote

Recreation and Access To Green Space
As well as Banbury Lane itself, there are numerous public footpaths running through Nethercote.

Road Traffic Orders

In 2004, Thames Valley Police raised a road traffic order, thus preventing vehicular access to the hamlet from the A422

See also
History of Banbury
Banbury cheese
Huscote, Banbury

References 

Hamlets in Oxfordshire
Banbury